Zephaniah is both a given name and surname. Name is Hebrew origin and it means "God has hidden".

Notable people with the name include:

Zephaniah Webster Bunce (1787–1889), American businessman
Zephaniah Kingsley Sr. (1734–1792), British merchant
Zephaniah Kingsley (1765–1843), American planter
Zephaniah Alexander Looby (1899–1972), American lawyer
Zephaniah Swift Moore (1770–1823), American Congregational clergyman
Zephaniah Ncube (born 1957), Zimbabwean long-distance runner
Zephaniah Platt (1735–1807), American politician
Zephaniah Platt (1796–1871), American politician
Zephaniah Skinner (born 1989), Australian rules footballer
Zephaniah Swift (1759–1823), American author
Zephaniah Thomas (born 1989), English footballer
Zephaniah Turner Jr. (1812–1876), American politician
Zephaniah Williams (1795–1874), Welsh Chartist
Benjamin Zephaniah (born 1958), British writer and dub poet with West Indian roots
John Zephaniah Bell (1794–1883), Scottish artist
John Zephaniah Holwell (1711–1798), British surgeon
Dewi Zephaniah Phillips (1934–2006), Welsh philosopher
Charles Zephaniah Platt (1773–1822), American politician

See also
Zeph (given name)